Cécile Fabre  (born 1971) is a French philosopher, serving as professor of philosophy at the University of Oxford. Since 2014 she has been a senior research fellow at All Souls College, Oxford. Her research focuses on political philosophy, the ethics of war, bioethics, and theories of justice.

Early life
Fabre was born on 2 February 1971 in Paris, France. From 1989 to 1992, she studied at Paris-Sorbonne University. She graduated with a Bachelor of Arts (BA) degree in 1992. She then moved to England to study political philosophy at the University of York and completed a Master of Arts (MA) degree in 1993. From 1993, she undertook postgraduate study in politics at the University of Oxford. Her supervisor was G. A. Cohen and she completed her Doctor of Philosophy (DPhil) degree in 1997.

Career and honours
Fabre served as Proctor of the University of Oxford from March 2018 to March 2019.

She was elected a Fellow of the British Academy (FBA) in 2011.

Selected works

Fabre, Cécile (2018). Economic Statecraft: Human Rights, Sanctions and Conditionality. Cambridge, Massachusetts: Harvard University Press. .

References

External links 
  
 Personal website 
 Two Podcast Interviews with Philosophy Bites (2011 & 2016). 
 Print Interview with Richard Marshall, of 3:AM Magazine (2012).
 Print Interview with Gary Cutting. New York Times Opinionator (2015).

21st-century French philosophers
Political philosophers
French women philosophers
Living people
1971 births
21st-century English philosophers
Fellows of the British Academy
Fellows of All Souls College, Oxford
Alumni of the University of York
Alumni of the University of Oxford